The Denfeld Mountains are a group of scattered mountains between Crevasse Valley Glacier and Arthur Glacier in the Ford Ranges of Marie Byrd Land. The mountains were explored by the Byrd Antarctic Expeditions (1928–30 and 1933–35) and by the United States Antarctic Service (1939–41) all led by Rear Admiral Richard E. Byrd. They were named for Admiral Louis E. Denfeld, Chief of Naval Operations and a member of the Joint Chiefs of Staff (1947–49), who helped in the planning and organization of Operation Highjump (1946–47) for which Byrd was leader.

See also
Mount Fulton

References

Ford Ranges